Luís Eduardo Grangeiro Girão (born 25 September 1972) more commonly known as Eduardo Girão is a Brazilian politician as well as a businessman and football club president. He has spent his political career representing Ceará, having served as federal senator since 2019.

Personal life
Religiously Girão considers himself as spiritualist, and was one of the biggest supporters in the establishment of the "National Day of Spiritism" as a federal holiday, which is on April 18, the date of publication of "The Book of Spirits" by Allan Kardec.

In 2017 Girão was elected chairman of the Fortaleza Esporte Clube.

Political career
Girão was elected to the federal senate in the 2018 Brazilian general election. In 2019 Girão switched to the Podemos party.

In 2023, he switched to the New Party (NOVO).

References 

1972 births
Living people
People from Fortaleza
Brazilian spiritualists
Brazilian businesspeople
Members of the Federal Senate (Brazil)
Republican Party of the Social Order politicians
Podemos (Brazil) politicians
New Party (Brazil) politicians